The 2017 Caterpillar Burnie International is a professional tennis tournament played on outdoor hard courts as part of the 2017 ATP Challenger Tour and the 2017 ITF Women's Circuit, offering a total of $75,000 in prize money for men and $60,000 for women. It was the fourteenth (for men) and eighth (for women) edition of the tournament, which returned to the tennis calendar after missing 2016 due to difficulty acquiring funds. It took place in Burnie, Tasmania, Australia, on 28 January–4 February 2017.

Men's singles entrants

Seeds 

 1 Rankings as of 16 January 2017.

Other entrants 
The following players received wildcards into the singles main draw:
  Alex Bolt
  Harry Bourchier
  Matthew Ebden
  Bradley Mousley

The following players received entry from the qualifying draw:
  Maverick Banes
  James Frawley
  Greg Jones
  Dayne Kelly

Women's singles entrants

Seeds 

 1 Rankings as of 16 January 2017

Other entrants 
The following players received wildcards into the singles main draw:
  Naiktha Bains
  Jaimee Fourlis
  Olivia Tjandramulia
  Sara Tomic

The following players received entry from the qualifying draw:
  Tessah Andrianjafitrimo
  Alexandra Stevenson
  Aleksandra Wozniak
  Zuzana Zlochová

Champions

Men's singles 

   Omar Jasika def.  Blake Mott 6–2, 6–2.

Women's singles 

  Asia Muhammad def.  Arina Rodionova 6–2, 6–1.

Men's doubles 

  Brydan Klein /  Dane Propoggia def.  Steven de Waard /  Luke Saville 6–3, 6–4.

Women's doubles 

  Riko Sawayanagi /  Barbora Štefková def.  Alison Bai /  Varatchaya Wongteanchai, 7–6(8–6), 4–6, [10–7].

External links 
 2017 Caterpillar Burnie International at Tennis Australia
 Official website

References 

2017 ITF Women's Circuit
2017 ATP Challenger Tour
2017 in Australian tennis
2017